The Evil Bong OST is the 2006 soundtrack album to the film of the same name directed by Charles Band. Released by Lakeshore Records on October 31, 2006, the album features songs by Insane Clown Posse, Twiztid and the Kottonmouth Kings, among others.

Track listing

References

2006 soundtrack albums
Comedy film soundtracks
Horror film soundtracks
Evil Bong (film series)